In the United States, the phrase testing the waters is used to describe someone who is exploring the feasibility of becoming a candidate for political office. It can also be used more generally as an idiom meaning to estimate the success of something by trying it out a little bit.

"Testing the waters" activities are to be paid for with candidate-permissible funds. Once an individual begins to campaign or decides to become a candidate, funds that were raised or spent to "test the waters" apply to the $5,000 threshold for qualifying as a candidate. This is because there is a federal law that once an individual raises or spends $5,000 for a campaign, they are required to register as a federal candidate.  Once that threshold is exceeded, the individual must register with the Federal Election Commission (FEC; for candidates for the United States House of Representatives) or the Secretary of the Senate (candidates for the United States Senate), and begin to file reports (including in the first report all activity that occurred prior to reaching the $5,000 threshold).

Once an individual registers as a federal candidate, election restrictions apply, including $2,700 on contributions. Also, once registered as a candidate, individuals cannot coordinate with political action committees (PACs) or super PACs under campaign finance law.

References

Politics